Protein Data Bank in Europe – Knowledge Base (PDBe-KB) is a community-driven, open-access, integrated resource whose mission is to place macromolecular structure data in their biological context and to make them accessible to the scientific community in order to support fundamental and translational research and education. It is part of the European Bioinformatics Institute (EMBL-EBI), based at the Wellcome Genome Campus, Hinxton, Cambridgeshire, England.

References

Medical databases
Science and technology in Cambridgeshire
South Cambridgeshire District